

47001–47100 

|-id=002
| 47002 Harlingten ||  || Caisey Harlingten (born 1947), Chilean amateur astronomer || 
|-id=005
| 47005 Chengmaolan ||  || Maolan Cheng (1905–1978), Chinese first director of the Beijing Astronomical Observatory, Chinese Academy of Sciences || 
|-id=038
| 47038 Majoni ||  || Vittore Majoni (1936–2002), Italian electrical engineer, secondary education teacher, and amateur astronomer, charter member of the "Associazione Astronomica Cortina", and director of the Helmut Ullrich Astronomical Observatory (Col Drusciè Observatory) || 
|-id=044
| 47044 Mcpainter ||  || John D. McClusky (1914–1994), American painter and founder of the Fredericksburg Art Guild from Fredericksburg, Texas, near the discovery site || 
|-id=045
| 47045 Seandaniel ||  || Sean Daniel Cooney (born 2002) is the son of the discoverer Walter R. Cooney Jr. and enjoys star parties with his family || 
|-id=077
| 47077 Yuji ||  || Yuji Nakamura (born 1956), Japanese amateur astronomer and chemical engineer, discoverer of comet  and re-discoverer of comet 122P/de Vico || 
|-id=086
| 47086 Shinseiko ||  || Shinseiko, Kanagawa prefecture, youngest natural lake of Japan, formed as a result of the Great Kantō earthquake of 1923 || 
|}

47101–47200 

|-id=144
| 47144 Faulkes || 1999 PY || Dill Faulkes (born 1944), British cosmologist and software tycoon, founder of the Dill Faulkes Educational Trust and the Faulkes Telescope Project || 
|-id=162
| 47162 Chicomendez ||  || Chico Mendes (1944–1988), Brazilian seringueiro who fought against environmental pollution of the Amazon forest, recipient of the 1987 Global 500 prize from the United Nations Environment Programme || 
|-id=164
| 47164 Ticino ||  || Ticino, a canton of Switzerland, where the Gnosca Observatory (the discovery site) is located || 
|-id=171
| 47171 Lempo ||  || Lempo is the ancient Finnish devil who, with the help of his two demon cohorts, Hiisi and Paha, brought down the hero Väinämöinen. Within the trans-Neptunian triple system, the satellite (47171) Lempo I was discovered on 2001 Dec. 8 by C. A. Trujillo and M. E. Brown using the Hubble Space Telescope (HST), and is named Paha. The primary was identified as a binary by S. D. Benecchi et al. through re-analysis of the HST data originally obtained by Trujillo and Brown. Lempo refers to the larger component of the central binary and Hiisi to the smaller component. || 
|}

47201–47300 

|-id=219
| 47219 Heatherkoehler ||  || Heather Koehler (born 1975) is an aerospace engineer at NASA's Marshall Space Flight Center. She took the lead in developing NASA's first generation of directional meteoroid models, used in the placement of shielding on many crewed and robotic spacecraft. || 
|-id=293
| 47293 Masamitsu || 1999 WO || Masamitsu Nakamura (born 1965), Japanese amateur astronomer and medical technologist, co-discoverer of comet C/1994 N1 (Nakamura-Nishimura-Machholz) || 
|-id=294
| 47294 Blanský les ||  || Blanský les (Blanský Forest), a Czech Protected Landscape Area in south Bohemia, dominated by Kleť Mountain || 
|}

47301–47400 

|-bgcolor=#f2f2f2
| colspan=4 align=center | 
|}

47401–47500 

|-id=466
| 47466 Mayatoyoshima ||  || Maya Toyoshima (born 1991) is a Japanese vocalist and original member of the musical group "Kalafina". || 
|-id=494
| 47494 Gerhardangl ||  || Gerhard Dangl (born 1959), an Austrian amateur astronomer and teacher || 
|}

47501–47600 

|-bgcolor=#f2f2f2
| colspan=4 align=center | 
|}

47601–47700 

|-id=619
| 47619 Johnpursch ||  || John Pursch (born 1958) is a long-time computing systems manager of the University of Arizona's Lunar and Planetary Laboratory and Department of Planetary Sciences. He has provided critical support for numerous planetary scientists, students and spacecraft missions. He is also known for his award-winning poetry. || 
|-id=620
| 47620 Joeplassmann ||  || Joe Plassmann (born 1965) is the systems manager for the University of Arizona's Lunar and Planetary Laboratory, Planetary Image Research Laboratory, and manages the ground data processing system for NASA's High Resolution Imaging Science Experiment on the Mars Reconnaissance Orbiter. || 
|-id=627
| 47627 Kendomanik || 2000 CX || Ken Domanik (born 1957) is a geologist, experimental petrologist and long-time manager of the Michael J. Drake Electron Microprobe Laboratory at the University of Arizona's Lunar and Planetary Laboratory. Renowned for his analytical expertise, he provides invaluable support for numerous scientists and students worldwide. || 
|-id=649
| 47649 Susanbrew ||  || Susan Brew (born 1951) served as the Program Manager for the University of Arizona and Arizona NASA Space Grant Consortium since the program's inception in 1988. Susan directly supported over 1 \, 300 STEM leaders, mentors and affiliates and her work has positively impacted the lives of countless others. || 
|}

47701–47800 

|-id=707
| 47707 Jamieson ||  || Harry D. Jamieson (born 1945) was one of the leading lights of the Association of Lunar and Planetary Observers in the 1960–2000 period, alternately serving as a Lunar Recorder, Board Member, Membership Secretary and then Director (1998–2000). During this time he organized their Lunar Dome program. || 
|-id=708
| 47708 Jimhamilton ||  || Jim Hamilton (1947–2021), an American amateur astronomer who lived in Caballo, New Mexico. || 
|-id=775
| 47775 Johnanderson ||  || John William Anderson (born 1953), American engineer at the Lunar and Planetary Laboratory of the University of Arizona. He analyzed and digitized images of the Surveyor program and worked at the university's TV station. || 
|}

47801–47900 

|-id=835
| 47835 Stevecoe ||  || Steve Coe (born 1949), an American amateur astronomer with the Saguaro Astronomical Society, in Phoenix, Arizona, and author of several book on observational astronomy || 
|-id=843
| 47843 Maxson ||  || Paul Maxson (born 1951), an American astrophotographer and coordinator at the Association of Lunar and Planetary Observers (ALPO), an international scientific and educational organization. In 2014 he received the Walter Haas Observer's Award from the ALPO for his high quality images. || 
|-id=851
| 47851 Budine ||  || Phillip Budine (born 1937) has been an avid lunar and planetary observer for decades. He has served in the Association of Lunar and Planetary Observers (ALPO), including being Recorder for the Jupiter Section. In 1992 he received the ALPO's Walter Haas Observer's Award for his years of excellent observational work. || 
|-id=891
| 47891 García-Migani ||  || Esteban García-Migani (born 1983) is a member of the Planetary Science Group of the Universidad Nacional de San Juan (Argentina). He specializes in the study of physical and dynamical properties of comets and active asteroids. || 
|}

47901–48000 

|-bgcolor=#f2f2f2
| colspan=4 align=center | 
|}

References 

047001-048000